Osiyan is a village in Unnao district, Uttar Pradesh, India near town Bighapur. J.D.V.M. Inter College, Osiyan, Unnao is in this village.

Villages in Unnao district